The Pearl River County Library System serves the people of Pearl River County. Its headquarters are located at the Margaret Reed Crosby Memorial Library in Picayune, Mississippi and a branch library is in Poplarville, Mississippi.

References

External links
Official website

Public libraries in Mississippi
Education in Pearl River County, Mississippi